Narkatiya Guthi is a Paroha Municipality in Rautahat District in the Narayani Zone of south-eastern Nepal. At the time of the 1991 Nepal census it had a population of 4893 people living in 919 individual households.

References

Populated places in Rautahat District